is a Japanese manga series written and illustrated by Kenshin Hidekawa. It was serialized in Kodansha's seinen manga magazine Monthly Afternoon from September 2011 to April 2015, with its chapters collected in five tankōbon volumes.

Publication
Written and illustrated by Kenshin Hidekawa, Kyō no Yuiko-san was serialized in Kodansha's seinen manga magazine Monthly Afternoon from September 24, 2011, to April 25, 2015. Kodansha collected its chapters in five tankōbon volumes, released from September 21, 2012, to June 23, 2015.

Volume list

References

Further reading

External links
 

Kodansha manga
Romantic comedy anime and manga
Seinen manga